Disks large-associated protein 4 (DAP-4) also known as SAP90/PSD-95-associated protein 4 (SAPAP-4) is a protein that in humans is encoded by the DLGAP4 gene.

Function 

DAP-4 is a membrane-associated guanylate kinase found at the postsynaptic density in neuronal cells. It is a signaling molecule that can interact with potassium channels and receptors, as well as other signaling molecules. DAP-4 can interact with PSD-95 through its guanylate kinase domain and may be involved in clustering PSD-95 in the postsynaptic density region. The encoded protein is one of at least four similar proteins that have been found. Alternatively spliced transcript variants encoding different isoforms have been found for this gene.

References

Further reading